Theodoor (Theo) van der Horst (Arnhem, Netherlands, 18 July 1921 - Arnhem, 9 October 2003), was a Dutch painter, sculptor, graphic artist and glass artist. Van der Horst painted people, animals and landscapes in an expressionist style.  Besides oil paintings he made etchings, drawings, gouaches, sculptures and stained glass. He exhibited until the seventies in galleries and museums, but then chose to live as a hermit. He died in October 2003 at the age of 82 in Arnhem.

Exhibitions (selection)
1954 - Gemeentemuseum Arnhem - retrospective-exhibition
 1962 - The Arnhem Gallery, Croydon (GB) - 6 Arnhem Painters (Wim Gerritsen, Klaas Gubbels, Jan Homan, Theo van der Horst, Johan Mekkink, Fred Sieger)
 1963 - Museum Marburg (D) 
 1965 -  CODA (Apeldoorn)|Gemeentelijke Van Reekum Galerij, Apeldoorn - Hedendaagse kunst in Gelderland (Marius van Beek, Klaas Gubbels, Theo van der Horst, Ko Oosterkerk, Fred Sieger, Piet Slegers, Gerrit Veenhuizen, Toon Vijftigschild).
 1967 - Theater München
 Stedelijk Museum Schiedam
 Dordrechts Museum
 Group exhibitions at Berlin, Milan en Antwerp

Awards
1954 - Prijs van de Provincie Zeeland (watersnoodschilderij)
1954 - Arnhemse prijs voor de beeldende kunst
1962 - Quarles van Uffordprijs voor schilderkunst (oeuvre)

Timeline

References

Dutch painters
Dutch male painters
Dutch male sculptors
Expressionist painters
People from Arnhem
1921 births
2003 deaths
20th-century Dutch sculptors
20th-century Dutch male artists